Langinkoski Church) is one of five Kymenlaakso-region Lutheran churches in Finland's Kotka-Kymi parish union. Located in the Metsola district of Kotka, the rectangular church was designed by Anders-Olof Bengts and completed in 1953.

The interior was constructed to resemble a medieval stone church; the hall can accommodate about 300 people and is wheelchair-accessible.

The church features Hilkka Toivola's colourful stained-glass window depicting Jesus rescuing a self-doubting Peter from drowning. The altar, pulpit and seats are of oak; the walls are of red brick. The pipe organ is a 17-stop instrument.

An annex houses the church office. Next to the church is a tall white belfry.

References

External links
 

1953 establishments in Finland
Lutheran churches in Finland
Buildings and structures in Kymenlaakso